The Grayson County Courthouse  is a historic county courthouse located at Independence, Grayson County, Virginia.  It was built in 1908 to replace an 1850 building. Designed by architect Frank Pierce Milburn and built by E.L. Robbins of Grassy Creek, Virginia, the eclectic brick building employs a Flemish gable flanked by turrets.

It was listed on the National Register of Historic Places in 1978.

Historic 1908 Courthouse
In 1979 the county opened a new courthouse.  The 1908 building now serves as an area art and cultural center that is operated by the Historic 1908 Courthouse Foundation, and houses the Grayson Crossroads Museum, Baldwin Auditorium, Treasury Gift Shop, and offices housing businesses and other non-profit organizations.

The Grayson Crossroads Museum is a museum of local history, with photos, pioneer and household artifacts.

The Baldwin Auditorium seats over 200 people and is located in the former courtroom space. The multi-purpose space is available for rental.

References

External links
 Historic 1908 Courthouse Foundation

Government buildings completed in 1908
Buildings and structures in Grayson County, Virginia
County courthouses in Virginia
Frank Pierce Milburn buildings
Romanesque Revival architecture in Virginia
Courthouses on the National Register of Historic Places in Virginia
National Register of Historic Places in Grayson County, Virginia
Tourist attractions in Grayson County, Virginia
1908 establishments in Virginia